FOVE is the first virtual reality headset to utilize built-in eye tracking technology. It was created by a Tokyo-based startup founded by Yuka Kojima (CEO) and Lochlainn Wilson (CTO). Announced in 2014, FOVE's technology uses infrared sensors within the headset to accurately track the user's pupils and eye movements with low latency, allowing the user to target and interact with objects by making eye contact with them.

Kickstarter Campaign for FOVE began in May, 2015, with an initial funding goal of $250,000. The goal was reached in less than 4 days. Backers who contributed $349+ were originally promised to receive a FOVE HMD in May, 2016. FOVE's Kickstarter campaign ultimately raised a total of $480,650.

Features
 Eye tracking with an accuracy of 1/20 of a degree
 Foveated rendering – The user's gaze is tracked and calculated so the graphical resources are allocated to where he or she is looking. The different areas of VR world sharpens and blurs depending on where the eyes are focusing.
 Move the head naturally – With eye tracking, users can avoid unnecessary head movements and minimize simulator sickness.
 Aim with the eyes – The user can target and interact with objects by glancing at them. They can use their gaze to aim weapon crosshairs in compatible FPS games, or create contextual menus for a gaze-based interface.
 Make eye contact – The user can easily make eye contact with virtual characters in-game, which could potentially be used to communicate emotions. Characters' behaviors and reactions could change when they are watched.

Hardware
FOVE will utilize SteamVR's Lighthouse technology for positional tracking.

Developer
FOVE SDK - integrates content from Unity, Unreal Engine and Cryengine. Developers can port existing VR content into FOVE or create new content.

API for Foveated rendering.

History
September 9, 2014 - FOVE was revealed at Tech Crunch Disrupt SF 2014.

May 19, 2015 - Kickstarter Campaign began.

May 23, 2015 - Kickstarter Goal of $250,000 was reached

June 25, 2015 - FOVE announced that it received an undisclosed amount of funding from Samsung Ventures, the venture capital arm of the Korean conglomerate.

June 25, 2015 - FOVE announced that it will use SteamVR's Lighthouse for positional tracking.

March 23, 2016 - FOVE closed an $11 million Series A funding round, but delayed shipment to Fall 2016 because of difficulty sourcing components.

References

Head-mounted displays